Starting From…Now! is an Australian television drama series which began airing on SBS2 on 7 March 2016. Created by writer, director, producer, Julie Kalceff, it began as an online series for the first three seasons from 2014 before Seasons 4 and 5 were picked up for television.    
 The series has over 42 million views and has been watched in 230 countries. Each season consists of six 10-minute episodes.

Plot
The drama is described as a "lesbian love quadrangle" following the lives of Emily, Steph, Kristen and Darcy  as they search for happiness and love and experience life in Sydney's inner west suburbs.

Cast
 Sarah de Possesse as Steph Fraser 
 Rosie Lourde as Darcy Peters 
 Lauren Orrell	as Kristen Sheriden 
 Bianca Bradey as Emily Rochford

Awards
Starting From Now has played on the global festival circuit, winning a number of awards including the Outstanding Diversity Award at Melbourne WebFest, 2017; the International Academy of Web Television Award of Recognition at Hollyweb Fest, 2017; the Audience Award at the Mardi Gras Film Festival, 2016; Outstanding Ensemble Cast in a Drama Series and Outstanding Writing in a Drama Series at LA WebFest, 2016; and Best Web Series at She Webfest, 2015. Starting From Now was a finalist at the Screen Producer Awards (Australia) in 2015 and 2017.

See also
Queer As Folk, UK television series
Queer As Folk, US television series
Banana
Cucumber

References

External links
 Starting From...Now! official website
 

2016 Australian television series debuts
2010s LGBT-related drama television series
Australian drama television series
Australian LGBT-related television shows
English-language television shows
Lesbian-related television shows
Television shows set in Sydney